Heinrich Bünting (1545 – 1606) was a Protestant pastor and theologian. He is best known for his book of woodcut maps titled Itinerarium Sacrae Scripturae (Travel book through Holy Scripture) first published in 1581.

Life
Bünting was born in Hannover, Germany, in 1545. He studied theology at the University of Wittenberg graduating in   1569 and became a Protestant pastor in Lemgo. He was dismissed in 1575 and moved to Gronau an der Leine. In 1591 he was appointed superintendent in Goslar. When a dispute arose over his teachings in 1600 he was dismissed and retired from the ministry. He spent the rest of his life as a private citizen in Hannover.

Itinerarium Sacrae Scripturae
His collection of woodcut maps, Itinerarium Sacrae Scripturae, first published in Magdeburg in 1581, was a very popular book in its day. It was reprinted and translated several times. The book provided the most complete summary of biblical geography available and described the Holy Land by following the travels of various notable people from the Old and New Testaments. In addition to conventional maps, the book also contained three figurative maps; the world depicted using a cloverleaf design thought to possibly represent the Trinity with Jerusalem in the center, Europe in the form of a crowned and robed woman, and Asia as the winged horse Pegasus.

References

External links
Bünting, Heinrich, 1545-1606 - Jewish National & University Library, The Eran Laor Cartographic Collection
 Itinerarivm sacrae scriptvrae : To gest : Putowání Swatých : Na wssecku Swatau Bibli obogiho Zákona, rozdělené na dwě knihy. Prwní kniha zawíra w sobě ... (in Czech translation). [s.n.] : Daniel Adam z Weleslawina, 1592. 831 p. - available online at University Library in Bratislava Digital Library

1545 births
1606 deaths
Clergy from Hanover
16th-century cartographers
German cartographers
16th-century Protestant religious leaders
Holy Land travellers
16th-century German writers
16th-century German male writers